The 1992–93 Ranji Trophy was the 59th season of the Ranji Trophy. Punjab won their first title defeating Maharashtra.

Highlights
Santosh Jedhe scored 867 runs and took 37 wickets in the season

Group stage

Central Zone

North Zone

South Zone

West Zone

East Zone

Knockout stage 

(F) - Advanced to next round on First Innings Lead
(T) - Advanced to next round on Spin of Coin

Final

Scorecards and averages
Cricketarchive

References

External links

1993 in Indian cricket
Domestic cricket competitions in 1992–93
Ranji Trophy seasons